Nina Solheim (born 4 August 1979) is a Norwegian taekwondo practitioner. She won a silver medal in the women's heavyweight (+67 kg) division at the 2008 Summer Olympics in Beijing, beaten by Mexican María del Rosario Espinoza in the final. She also qualified and competed in the women's middleweight (67 kg) division at the 2004 Summer Olympics in Athens. She lost in the quarterfinals against Luo Wei of China after injuring her knee.

In addition to a bronze medal from the 2001 World Taekwondo Championships in Jeju, South Korea, Solheim won the gold medal in middleweight (72 kg) at the 2006 World Cup in Bangkok, Thailand.

Solheim is a well known athlete in Norway. She was born in South Korea, and at the age of seven months, she and her twin sister Mona were adopted by Norwegian parents, growing up in Namsos.

References

External links
 Official website

1979 births
Living people
Norwegian female taekwondo practitioners
Norwegian people of Korean descent
Taekwondo practitioners at the 2004 Summer Olympics
Taekwondo practitioners at the 2008 Summer Olympics
Olympic taekwondo practitioners of Norway
Olympic silver medalists for Norway
People from Namsos
Olympic medalists in taekwondo
Twin sportspeople
Norwegian twins
Medalists at the 2008 Summer Olympics
Norwegian adoptees
South Korean adoptees
South Korean emigrants to Norway
European Taekwondo Championships medalists
World Taekwondo Championships medalists
21st-century Norwegian women